Elizabeth M. "Libbe" Hubley (born September 8, 1942) is a Canadian politician who sat in the Senate of Canada representing Prince Edward Island from 2001 until her retirement in 2017.

In 1989 she was elected to Prince Edward Island's legislative assembly as a Liberal. She was re-elected in 1993 and served as Deputy Speaker of the legislature from 1993 to 1996.

On March 8, 2001, Hubley was appointed to the Canadian Senate on the advice of Prime Minister Jean Chrétien. Beginning in 2006, she was the Deputy Whip of the Liberal Party.

On January 29, 2014, Liberal Party leader Justin Trudeau announced all Liberal Senators, including Hubley, were removed from the Liberal caucus, and would continue sitting as Independents. The Senators continue to refer to themselves as the Senate Liberal Caucus even though they are no longer members of the parliamentary Liberal caucus.

Hubley is a past member and longtime supporter of the Girl Guides of Canada.

References

External links
 
Liberal Senate Forum

1942 births
Living people
Members of the United Church of Canada
People from Prince County, Prince Edward Island
Canadian senators from Prince Edward Island
Liberal Party of Canada senators
Prince Edward Island Liberal Party MLAs
Women MLAs in Prince Edward Island
Women members of the Senate of Canada
21st-century Canadian politicians
21st-century Canadian women politicians